Operation Albion was a World War I German air, land and naval operation against the Russian forces in October 1917 to occupy the West Estonian Archipelago. The land campaign opened with German landings at the Tagalaht bay on the island of Saaremaa, on 12 October 1917, after extensive naval operations to clear mines and subdue coastal artillery batteries. The Germans secured the island by 16 October and the Russian army evacuated Muhu on 20 October.

After two failed attempts, the Germans landed on Hiiumaa on 12 October, capturing the island on the following day.  The Russian Baltic Fleet had to withdraw from the Suur Strait after its losses at the Battle of Moon Sound. The Germans claimed 20,000 prisoners and 100 guns captured during Operation Albion from 12 to 20 October.

Strategic significance
At the beginning of World War I the islands were of little importance to the Russian Empire or Germany. After the revolutionary turmoil in Russia during the early part of 1917, the German high command believed capturing the islands would outflank Russian defences and lay Petrograd (St. Petersburg) vulnerable to attack.

Order of battle

German units
 Naval Forces (Sonderverband): Vice Admiral Ehrhard Schmidt
 Battlecruiser:  (flagship)
 III Battle Squadron (III. Geschwader) (Vice Admiral Paul Behncke) dreadnought battleships:  (flagship), 
 IV Battle Squadron (IV. Geschwader) (Vice Admiral Wilhelm Souchon) dreadnought battleships:  (flagship), 
 II Cruiser Squadron (II. Aufklärungsgruppe) (Rear Admiral Ludwig von Reuter) light cruisers:  (flagship), 
 IV Cruiser Squadron (VI. Aufklärungsgruppe) (Rear Admiral Albert Hopman) light cruisers:  (flagship), ; minelayer: ; tender: 
 Torpedo Boats (Commodore Paul Heinrich) cruiser:  (flagship)
 II Torpedo Boat Flotilla: B 98; 3rd Half-Flotilla: G 101, V 100, G 103, G 104; 4th Half-Flotilla: B 109, B 110, B 111, B 97, B 112
 VI Torpedo Boat Flotilla: V 69; 12th Half-Flotilla: V 43, S 50, V 44, V 45, V 46; 13th Half-Flotilla: V 82, S 64 , S 61, S 63, V 74
 VIII Torpedo Boat Flotilla: V 180; 15th Half-Flotilla: V 183, V 185, V 181, V 184, V 182; 16th Half-Flotilla: S 176, S 178, G 174, S 179, V 186
 X Torpedo Boat Flotilla:: S 56; 19th Half-Flotilla: T 170, T 169, T 172, G 175, T 165; 20th Half-Flotilla: V 78, V 77, G 89, S 65, S 66
 VII Half-Flotilla: T 154, T 158, T 157, T 151, T 160, T 145, T 140, T 139
 Courland Submarine Flotilla (U-BootsFlottille Kurland): UC 56, UC 57, UC 58, UC 59, UC 60, UC 78
 Minesweepers (Minensuchdienst)
 II Minesweeper Flotilla: A 62; 3rd Half-Flotilla: T 136, M 67, M 68, M 75, M 76, M 77, T 59, T 65, T 68, T 82, T 85; 4th Half-Flotilla: T 104, T 53, T 54, T 55, T 56, T 60, T 61, T 62, T 66, T 67, T 69; 8th Half-Flotilla: M 64, M 11, M 31, M 32, M 39, A 35
 III Half-Flotilla of the Search Flotilla: T 141, 15 motor-boats
 Mine-Searcher Group of the Outpost Half-Flotilla East: 6 fishing vessels
 I Minesweeper Division (Riga): 11 motor-boats
 II Minesweeper Division: 12 motor-boats
 III Minesweeper Division: 12 motor-boats
 IV Minesweeper Division: 10 motor-boats; outpost boat O 2
 Mine-barrage Breaker group (Sperrbrechergruppe): Rio Parbo, Lothar, Schwaben, Elass
 Anti-Submarine Forces (U-Bootsabwehr)
 Baltic Search Flotilla: T 144; 1st half-flotilla: T 142, A 32, A 28, A 30, 32 fishing vessels; 2nd half-flotilla: T 130, A 31, A 27, A 29, 24 fishing vessels
 Ground Forces: Generalleutnant Ludwig von Estorff
 42nd Division
 2nd Infanterie Cyclist Brigade

Russian units
 425th, 426th and 472nd Infantry Regiments
 Battleships: , 
 Armored cruisers: , 
 Gunboats: , 
 Blockship: Lavwija
 Minelayer:

British units

See also

 German occupation of Estonia during World War I
 British submarine flotilla in the Baltic

Citations and references

Cited sources

External links

 1 October entries on this site summarise Operation Albion
 Detailed account of Operation Albion
 "Oesel Genommen", film footage of the invasion in 1917 from the German Federal Archives
 Gregory Thiele "Operation Albion and Joint Amphibious Doctrine" Joint Forces Quarterly October 2010

1917 in Estonia
1917 in Russia
Amphibious operations involving Germany
Amphibious operations of World War I
Baltic Sea operations of World War I
Military history of Estonia
Military operations of World War I involving Germany
Military operations of World War I involving Russia
Military operations of World War I involving the United Kingdom
October 1917 events